The II Corps, also known as II Strike Corps is a corps of Pakistan Army stationed in Multan, Punjab Province of Pakistan. The corps was active in Pakistan's theatre in War on Terror where its administrative divisions and brigades led numerous operations in the Federally Administered Tribal Areas of Pakistan. The corps is currently commanded by Lieutenant-General Akhtar Nawaz . The longest-serving commander of this corps was Lieutenant-General Rahimuddin Khan who commanded for five and half years (from September 1978 to March 1984).

History
In 1967 this corps headquarters was established in Multan.

The II corps was the 3rd newly created corps of the Pakistan Army as necessity of corps formations were being earnestly felt by the General Headquarters (GHQ), they wanted more decentralization of the army units, therefore intermediates between divisions and the GHQ were to be created and it were more corps headquarters.

1971 War
The Corps was commanded by Lt. Gen. Tikka Khan during the war. Controversially one of its divisions; the 18th Infantry Division, was taken out of II Corp's command and sent on an ill-fated offensive towards Ramgarh; which led to the debacle at the Battle of Longewala, the fact it was under GHQ rather than II Corps, spared the corps of any blame, but was later deemed one of the causes of failure. A major Indian attack towards Umerkot would be defeated by two of the corps divisions; the 18th after its return from Ramgarh and to II Corps command, and the 33rd Infantry Division, a task for which they were commended, after the war. In the final analysis its performance in the war; while commended by many parties, would be controversial, since at no time was its most powerful formation, 1st Armoured Division, committed to action.

War in North-West Pakistan
As a heavy armoured and mechanized formation, it was unsuited for the mountain warfare that characterized the army's commitments over the next three decades in Kashmir, Siachen and Kargil, although it a few units did see action attached to other corps. As Pakistan's main strategic reserve, it was also not sent on overseas operations under the UN and with allies (such as Gulf War I and Somalia) which the army was ordered to undertake.

It would not be until 2008 when the elements of the corps would see action again. As the war in FATA heated up and militant activity increased to a hitherto unseen level, the government responded by launching a massive operation (code-named Operation Zalzala meaning earthquake) against the militant strongholds South Waziristan. The operation would be spearheaded by 14th Infantry Division of II Corps, and would succeed in evicting the militants from their stronghold. On December 26, 2008, elements of the 14th Infantry Division, were being redeployed to the Indian border.

Structure
The Corps Order of Battle is:

List of corps commanders

References

External links
Corps formation sign can be seen on Pak Army Flags page

1971 establishments in Pakistan
2
Military units and formations established in 1971